Habib Kashani is an Iranian politician and businessman. He is an outgoing member of City Council of Tehran since 10 April 2003. He was the chairman of famous multisport club Persepolis Athletic and Cultural Club based in Tehran, Iran, between 1 June 2007 to 1 June 2008 and for a second term from 1 October 2009 to 20 September 2011. He is also a member of the AFC Committee for Professional Clubs and business manager of Iran national under-23 football team.

Early life
He was born on 6 March 1955 in Tehran, Iran. He begin teaching in Tehran schools after receiving his B.C. from Isfahan University. He participated in the Iran–Iraq War from 1981 to 1985. When he returned to Tehran, he continue his teaching career. He was a sports teacher.

Sports career
He became chairman of the club on 1 June 2007. He contracted with Afshin Ghotbi in the 2007–08 Persian Gulf Cup and with Ghotbi became champion of that year's league. He resigned from his post one year later and continued his career in City Council. When Abbas Ansarifard resigned his position in September 2009, Kashani was re-selected as chairman of the club and in December 2009, he was contracted with Ali Daei but was unsuccessful in the league. They won the 2009–10 Hazfi Cup. Kashani has been a board member of the Football Federation of Iran since August 3, 2010. After triumphing another Hazfi Cup with Ali Daei in next season, Daei left the club due to conflicts between Kashani and him, which were unfolded in a highly disputed debate at Navad. He signed a contract with the choice of "Technical Committee", Hamid Estili as new head coach of Persepolis on 21 June 2011.

Some fans believed that the Technical Committee was a show from Kashani to pull over Daei, and select his "beloved friend" Estili. In the opening match of the season against Malavan, which ended 1–1 after the weak performance of Persepolis and late tying goal by Hossein Badamaki, fans started screaming the name of Ali Daei since 60th minute, showing their displeasure. protests continued in next matches by booing Estili and Kashani, and slogans wanting them to leave the club. In a poll by Navad on August 15, 2011, 51% believed that the way Estili was chosen is the main reason of protests. Other reasons included weak performance by players (36%) and impatient fans (13%). Kashani resigned as chairman of Persepolis on 20 September 2011.

Signings

Political career
He was elected as Member of City Council of Tehran in local election of 2003 and assumed office on 10 April 2003. He is a supporter of Mahmoud Ahmadinejad. Then, he was re-elected in 2006 and 2013 and currently is the longest-serving member of the council along with Mehdi Chamran.

References

External links

1955 births
Iranian businesspeople
Iranian football chairmen and investors
Living people
Alliance of Builders of Islamic Iran politicians
Popular Front of Islamic Revolution Forces politicians
Tehran Councillors 2013–2017
Tehran Councillors 2007–2013
Tehran Councillors 2003–2007